Forster Music Publisher, Inc. was a major American publisher of popular songs founded in 1916 in Chicago by Fred John Adam Forster (1878–1956).  The company had an office in New York and its music was of the Tin Pan Alley genre.  For most of its existence, the firm was located at 216 South Wabash, Chicago.

History 
Forster founded an earlier firm, F. J. A. Forster, in 1903 as a jobber in sheet music.  In 1922, Forster merged F. J. A. Forster with Forster Music Publisher, Inc.

Selected publications 
 Chasing the Fox, Percy Wenrich (1922)
 Oh, Johnny, Oh, Johnny, Oh! music by Abe Olman, lyrics by Ed Rose (1917) – recorded by Bonnie Baker with the Orrin Tucker Orchestra (Columbia Records: over 1 million records sold)
piano and vocal works by Louise Cooper Spindle
Songs by Charles L. Johnson
 Butterflies: Caprice (1908)
 Teasing the Cat (1916)
 Monkey-Bizniz: Novelty for Piano (1928)
 Pink Poodle One Step (1914)
 Blue Goose Rag (Johnson uses the pseudonym Raymond Birch) (1916)

See also 
 Charles L. Johnson, Fred Forster's closest business partner
 Raymond A. Sherwood, lyricist

References 

Music publishing companies of the United States
Defunct companies based in Chicago
Publishing companies established in 1916